B. M. Senguttuvan (1940/1 – 2 July 2021) was elected to the Tamil Nadu Legislative Assembly from the Marungapuri constituency in the 1996 elections. He was a candidate of the Dravida Munnetra Kazhagam (DMK) party. He died on 2 July 2021.

References 

1940s births
2021 deaths
People from Tiruchirappalli district
Tamil Nadu MLAs 1996–2001
Dravida Munnetra Kazhagam politicians
Year of birth uncertain